Three Warriors is a 1977 American drama film directed by Kieth Merrill, written by Sy Gomberg, and starring Charles White-Eagle, McKee Redwing, Lois Red Elk, Randy Quaid, Christopher Lloyd and Trey Wilson. It premiered at the Chicago International Film Festival in October 1977 and was released in February 1978 by United Artists.

Plot

Cast 
Charles White-Eagle as Grandfather
McKee Redwing as Michael 
Lois Red Elk as Mother
Randy Quaid as Ranger Quentin Hammond
Christopher Lloyd as Steve Chaffey
Trey Wilson as Chuck
Michael Huddleston as Pat
Raydine Spino as Older Sister
Stacey Leonard as Younger Sister
Mel Lambert as Horsedealer
Dean Brooks as Officer at Fair
Byron Patt as Michael's Father
Lynn Miller as Slaughterhouse Supervisor
Nathan Jim Sr. as Mechanic
Avex Miller Sr. as Mechanic's Father
Harold Cedartree as Singer

References

External links 
 
 

1977 films
United Artists films
American drama films
1977 drama films
Films directed by Kieth Merrill
Films produced by Saul Zaentz
1978 drama films
1978 films
1970s English-language films
1970s American films